Varone is a surname. Notable people with the surname include:

Doug Varone, American dancer and cinematographer
Phil Varone (born 1967), American rock drummer, music producer and songwriter
Phil Varone (ice hockey) (born 1990), Canadian ice hockey player
Sara Varone (born 1972), Italian television presenter